The Greater Ontario Junior Hockey League (GOJHL) is a Canadian junior ice hockey league based in Southern Ontario, Canada. The league is sanctioned by the Ontario Hockey Association, Ontario Hockey Federation, and Hockey Canada. The league is considered Junior B by the OHA, although it has attempted several times to be promoted to Junior A.

The league was created in 2007 through the merging of the Western Ontario Hockey League, Mid-Western Junior Hockey League, and Golden Horseshoe Junior Hockey League to dissuade perceived "player raiding" from teams in the then-Ontario Provincial Junior A Hockey League. The twenty-five teams of the Greater Ontario Junior Hockey League come from Southwestern Ontario and the Golden Horseshoe.

History

In the late 1990s, the Western Ontario Junior B Hockey League began complaining about their top level players being pulled from their teams at trade deadline time by Ontario Provincial Junior A Hockey League clubs without permission or compensation. A common view in Southern Ontario Junior B circles is that Junior "A" and Junior "B" are approximately the same skill level. In fact the OPJHL was known as the Central Ontario Junior B Hockey League until 1993, as well the Metro Junior A Hockey League which folded in 1998 was a Junior "B" league until 1991.

During the 2006–07 season, the general managers of all Ontario Hockey Association Junior "B" teams came together and voted unanimously to merge and create the Greater Ontario Junior Hockey League effective for the 2007–08 season. The GOJHL will become the sole competing body of the Sutherland Cup, which had as many as eight leagues competing for it at one time.

The 2007–08 season did not begin as planned. The management of the Mid-Western league resigned and needed to be replaced, and with a lack of organization due to the short time the new management had to get organized, the MWJHL had to opt out of an interlocking schedule. As a result, the entire GOJHL went without an interlocking schedule for 2007–08. The 2008–09 season saw the complete liquidation of all three divisional managements and a single governing body was put in place for the league. Additionally, inter-divisional play would also commence.

In the future, the league has stated that it will pursue club expansion, a reconfiguration that will move the league from three to four divisions, and possibly a move to join the Canadian Junior A Hockey League in future years.

On September 8, 2007, the Cambridge Winterhawks and the Guelph Dominators played the first ever game since the inception of the GOJHL. Despite leading 2-0 and outshooting Guelph, the defending Sutherland Cup Champions allowed five unanswered goals to drop the game 5–2. On May 3, 2008, the Tecumseh Chiefs finished a four-game sweep of the Elmira Sugar Kings to win the first ever GOJHL championship.

On September 24, 2008, the GOJHL hosted its first interdivisional regular season game between the Golden Horseshoe's Wheatfield Jr. Blades and the Western's London Nationals in London, Ontario. The Nationals won the game 6–2.

The LaSalle Vipers, 2010 Sutherland Cup champions, were asked to represent the Ontario Hockey Association and Hockey Canada for "Canada Day" in Mexico. On December 16, 2010, the Vipers played the Mexico Under-20 National Team and defeated them 9–2 in Mexico City.  In January 2011, the GOJHL's Golden Horseshoe Conference and Midwestern Conference hosted the Russian Minor Hockey League's "Red Stars" who did not make their Under-20 Team. On January 1, the MHL Red Stars defeated the Golden Horseshoe Conference 7-4 and on January 3, the Red Stars defeated the Midwestern Conference 11–3. The MHL is Russia's top tier Junior league, while each conference of the GOJHL is a third of Southern Ontario's third-tier of Junior hockey.

On October 10, 2012, the OHA announced its intention to expand east of Guelph and form a new fourth conference for the GOJHL. The announcement comes on the heels of the relocation of the Owen Sound Greys to Brampton by their sponsor, leaving the northerly city out of OHA junior hockey for the first time in ninety-nine years (not including wartime). In January 2014, the OHA announced that the plan to expand was on hold due to lack of serious parties. They announced that of eleven applicants, only four were substantial enough to play in the league. A Brantford group applied for expansion none-the-less, while the other three parties are currently in limbo. The Brantford group was approved for membership into the Midwestern Conference as the Brantford 99'ers.

On March 28, 2014, the GOJHL's representatives filed for promotion from Junior B to Junior A with the Ontario Hockey Association. The matter was discussed at the OHA head office on April 5, 2014. A few weeks later, the OHA rejected the promotion and the GOJHL's chairman was dismissed by the OHA. During the 2014–15 season, the Golden Horseshoe Conference held a vote to determine their future with the GOJHL. The teams voted to leave the GOJHL with OHA approval and govern autonomously from the league. In retaliation, the GOJHL invited no players from the Golden Horseshoe to the league's all-star game, forcing the Golden Horseshoe to play their own game in short order late in the season. The GOJHL playoff format remains unchanged for 2015 despite the shuffle. Before the playoffs began in 2015, the GOJHL announced that the Golden Horseshoe had rejoined the fold and that its annexation was averted.

In early May 2017, the Cambridge Winterhawks announced their intentions to sever ties with the OHA, stating that they would not be part of the GOJHL going forward. The GOJHL initial response was to withhold comment until further details could be established.

Teams

Former teams (As of 2007)
 Brantford 99ers - Renamed as Brantford Bandits for 2019-20 season
 Brampton Bombers - Moved to Caledon for the 2020-21 season as the Caledon Bombers
 Guelph Hurricanes - Moved to Cambridge for the 2018-19 season as the Cambridge Redhawks
 Kitchener Dutchmen – Franchise purchased by Ayr Centennials Jr C. & promoted to Jr. B in 2020.
 Petrolia Jets - Moved to Forest for 2008-09 season as the Lambton Shores Predators
 Lambton Shores Predators - Moved to Komoka for the 2017-18 season as the Komoka Kings
 Port Colborne Pirates - Moved to Pelham in 2014 as the Pelham Pirates
 Pelham Pirates renamed as Pelham Panthers for 2014-15 season
 Stoney Creek Warriors - Moved to Ancaster for the 2013-14 season as the Ancaster Avalanche
 Ancaster Avalanche - Moved to Hamilton for the 2018-19 season as the Hamilton Kilty B's
 Sarnia Blast - Renamed as Sarnia Legionnaires for 2008-09 season
 Tecumseh Chiefs - Moved to LaSalle for 2008–19 as the LaSalle Vipers.
 Wheatfield Jr. Blades - Move to Cheektowaga, NY for 2011-12 season, rename to Buffalo Blades
 Buffalo Blades - Renamed to Buffalo Regals for 2013-14 season
 Buffalo Regals - Moved to Lockport, NY for 2018-19 season, change name to Lockport Regals
 Lockport Regals - Move to Cheektowaga, NY for 2019-20 season, change name to Buffalo Regals
 Buffalo Regals resign from GOJHL for 2021 season due to COVID-19 pandemic

2021–22 playoffs

Golden Horseshoe Conference

Midwestern Conference

Western Conference

Sutherland Cup
As part of the first structural change to the Sutherland Cup playoffs since 1993–94 season, the GOJHL and OHA have thrown out the three-team round robin that had been used for twenty seasons and opted for a more traditional playdown method.  The Sutherland Cup semi-final will now have four teams squaring off in a pair of best-of-7 series to determine the finals.  The champions of the three Conferences will be joined by the conference runner-up who has the best playoff record to date.  This Wild Card team will play the top ranked Champion who they have not already met in the playoffs.

Regular season champions
This is a list of divisional regular season champions and their point totals, bolded are the overall league regular season champions.

Sutherland Cup champions
For OHA Junior "B" champions prior to the 2007-08 season, please visit: Sutherland Cup.

Bold denotes Sutherland Cup Champion.  Italicized denotes Sutherland Cup finalist.

League championship series
Bolded is winner of Sutherland Cup as GOJHL and OHA champion.

Records

Team
Single season records.
Best Record: 2013–14 Caledonia Corvairs (45-3-1)
Worst Record: 2012–13 Buffalo Blades (1-49-1)
Longest Winning Streak: 2013–14 Kitchener Dutchmen (25 games)
Longest Losing Streak: 2016–17 Buffalo Regals (33 games)
Longest Winless Streak: 2016–17 Buffalo Regals (33 games)
Most Goals For: 2016–17 Caledonia Corvairs (353)
Fewest Goals For: 2016–17 Buffalo Regals (66)
Most Goals Against: 2016–17 Buffalo Regals (536)
Fewest Goals Against: 2014–15 Caledonia Corvairs (74)
Largest Deficit: Buffalo Regals 0 @ Caledonia Corvairs 28 on Jan. 28, 2017 (28)
Highest Scoring Shutout: Buffalo Regals 0 @ Caledonia Corvairs 28 on Jan. 28, 2017 (28-0)
Highest Combined Score: Caledonia Corvairs 28 @ Buffalo Regals 2 on Feb. 14, 2017 (30)
Longest Overtime Game: St. Catharines Falcons 2 @ Ancaster Avalanche 3 4OT on Mar. 23, 2016 (Game length 131:05)

Player
Single season records.
Most Goals: 64 Josh McQuade, Brantford Eagles 2009–10
Most Assists: 94 Dayne Phillips, Port Colborne Pirates 2012–13
Most Points: 150 Josh McQuade, Brantford Eagles 2009–10
Most Penalty Minutes: 240 Patrick McCabe, Niagara Falls Canucks 2016-17

Goalie
Single season records.
Most Games Played: 47 Daryl Borden, Brantford Golden Eagles 2009-10
Most Wins: 40 Colin Furlong, Caledonia Corvairs 2013–14
Highest Save Percentage: 0.943, Andrew MacLean, St. Catharines Falcons 2021-22
Lowest Goals Against Average: 1.45, Andrew MacLean, St. Catharines Falcons 2021-22
Most Shutouts: 10, Andrew MacLean, St. Catharines Falcons 2021–22

NHL Draft
This is a list of first round National Hockey League draft picks of players straight out of the GOJHL.
Daultan Leveille - 2008 1st Rd - 29th Overall to Atlanta Thrashers (St. Catharines Falcons)

Timeline of teams

2007 - Mid-Western Junior Hockey League, Western Ontario Hockey League, and Golden Horseshoe Junior Hockey League merge to form GOJHL
2008 - Tecumseh Chiefs move and become LaSalle Vipers
2008 - Petrolia Jets move and become Lambton Shores Predators
2008 - Sarnia Blast become Sarnia Legionnaires
2008 - Brantford Golden Eagles become Brantford Eagles
2008 - Port Colborne Sailors become Port Colborne Pirates
2009 - Guelph Dominators become Guelph Hurricanes
2009 - Owen Sound Greys take one-year leave
2010 - Owen Sound Greys return to league
2011 - Wheatfield Jr. Blades move and become Buffalo Blades
2012 - Owen Sound Greys relocate and become Brampton Bombers
2012 - Brantford Eagles relocate and become Caledonia Corvairs
2013 - Buffalo Blades are renamed Buffalo Regals
2013 - Brantford 99'ers are granted expansion
2013 - Stoney Creek Warriors relocated and become Ancaster Avalanche
2013 - Caledonia Corvairs switch from Mid-Western to Golden Horseshoe Conference
2013 - Round Robin eliminated after Conference finals, a Wild Card entry added to league semi-final
2014 - Port Colborne Pirates relocate and become Pelham Pirates
2014 - Buffalo Regals take one-year leave
2014 - Pelham Pirates change name to Pelham Panthers mid-season.
2015 - Buffalo Regals take another one-year leave after failing to properly file paperwork for reinstatement
2016 - Buffalo Regals return after two-year hiatus
2017 - Cambridge Winterhawks withdraw from OHA and therefore GOJHL. Failure to have Tier 1 designated appears to be main reason.
2017 - Lambton Shores Predators relocate and become Komoka Kings
2018 - Ancaster Avalanche relocate to Hamilton and become Hamilton Kilty B's
2018 - Guelph Hurricanes relocate to Cambridge and become Cambridge Redhawks
2018 - Caledonia Corvairs take one-year leave
2018 - Buffalo Regals relocate to Lockport and become Lockport Regals
2019 - Caledonia Corvairs back from leave of absence, Brantford 99ers change name to Brantford Bandits
2020 - Ayr Centennials purchase Kitchener Dutchmen franchise, relocate to Ayr, Waterloo Siskins change name to Kitchener-Waterloo Siskins, Brampton Bombers move to Caledon, ON and rename the Caledon Bombers. Buffalo Regals, Welland Jr. Canadians take one-year leave due to COVID-19
2021- Buffalo Regals resign from the GOJHL

References

External links

Ontario Hockey Association website

 
2007 establishments in Ontario
B
B
Ontario Hockey Association
Sports leagues established in 2007